Monica Cirinnà (born 15 February 1963) is an Italian politician and a senator of the Democratic Party from 2013 to 2022.

Biography
Cirinnà graduated in law in 1993 at Sapienza University of Rome. She is known for being the author of the bill on civil unions in Italy, which was approved by the Senate of the Republic in February 2016 after removing adoption rights, and by the Chamber of Deputies in May of the same year.

References

1963 births
Living people
Politicians from Rome
20th-century Italian politicians
21st-century Italian politicians
Democratic Party (Italy) politicians
Members of the Senate of the Republic (Italy)
21st-century Italian women politicians
20th-century Italian women politicians
Women members of the Senate of the Republic (Italy)